Martín, el hombre y la leyenda is a Chilean biographical  miniseries written by Rodrigo Cuevas based on the life of Chilean boxer Martín Vargas. The series consists of 4 episodes and premiered on 7 May 2018, and ended on 10 May 2018. It stars Gastón Salgado as the titular character.

Plot 
The series delves into the known and unknown details of the life of the boxer Martín Vargas, who disputed four times the world title of El Peso de Mosca between 1977 and 1980, and enjoyed a fame rarely seen in the country, from his humble beginnings in Osorno until his rise to fame. In addition, his intimate and complex relationship with his wife Mireya Inostroza, his famous battles for the world title that paralyzed the entire country in the midst of the Military dictatorship of Chile (1973–1990), the difficult relationship with his manager Lucio Hernández, his outright fall and his subsequent redemption will be shown. in the 90's.

Cast 
 Gastón Salgado as Martín Vargas
 Alfredo Castro as Lucio Hernández
 Mario Horton as Fernando Páez
 Lucas Bolvarán as Martín Adolfo Vargas
 Otilio Castro as Juan Peralta
 Alejandro Goic as Edgardo Valdebenito
 Francisca Lewin as Mireya Inostroza

Ratings 
 
}}

Episodes

References

External links 
 

2018 telenovelas
2018 Chilean television series debuts
2018 Chilean television series endings
Chilean telenovelas
Spanish-language telenovelas
Mega (Chilean TV channel) telenovelas